Matt Cardone (born June 18, 1993) is an American former soccer player who played for San Antonio FC in the USL Championship.

Early life and education
Cardone was born in San Antonio, Texas. He played college soccer at Trinity University between 2011 and 2014, where he was twice named All-America.

Professional career
After a trial with Major League Soccer's Orlando City SC, Cardone signed with North American Soccer League side San Antonio Scorpions on April 17, 2015. The club ceased operations in December 2015. Then on February 4, 2016 Cardone was signed by the United Soccer League's newest franchise, San Antonio FC.

On June 29, 2022, Cardone, the last member remaining from San Antonio FC's inaugural squad, announced his retirement from soccer, effective with the conclusion of the July 2, 2022 match against Charleston Battery.  As of the date of his retirement, Cardone held club records for appearances (109), saves (328), clean sheets (26), and minutes played (9,650).  In USL Championship history, he ranked eighth all-time with 323 regular-season saves, tied for most saves with a single franchise, and third in keeper appearances with a franchise.

References

1993 births
Living people
American soccer players
Soccer players from San Antonio
Trinity Tigers men's soccer players
San Antonio Scorpions players
San Antonio FC players
North American Soccer League players
Association football goalkeepers
USL Championship players